Microeledone mangoldi, the sickle-tooth pygmy octopus, is a species of octopus from the family Megaleledonidae. This species was described in 2004, the type specimen being a male which was collected from a depth of approximately  near the Norfolk Ridge, in the southwest Pacific Ocean near New Caledonia. It is a very small octopus which has a single row of suckers, lacks an ink sac and has a radula with seven rows of teeth with the unique central tooth, called the rechidian tooth, being curved with a grooved tip. The remaining teeth are flat and plate like and so are also distinctive. The smooth creamy-pink body lacks any chromatophores. The specific name honours the Swiss malacologist and marine biologist Katharina Mangold-Wirz (1922-2003).

References

Cephalopod genera
Molluscs described in 2004